The 1933 Sewanee Tigers football team was an American football team that represented Sewanee: The University of the South as a member of the Southeastern Conference during the 1933 college football season. In their third season under head coach Harry E. Clark, Sewanee compiled a 3–6 record.

Schedule

References

Sewanee
Sewanee Tigers football seasons
Sewanee Tigers football